Tennessee Williams: Mad Pilgrimage of the Flesh is a book by John Lahr first published in 2014. It is a biography of Tennessee Williams. It was published by Bloomsbury Publishing in the UK and by W. W. Norton Company in the US.

Awards and honors
2014 National Book Critics Circle Award (Biography) winner.

References

2014 non-fiction books
Biographies about LGBT people
American biographies
Biographies about writers
National Book Critics Circle Award-winning works
Bloomsbury Publishing books
W. W. Norton & Company books